Boilerplate may refer to:
 Relatively thick, high-quality sheet steel used in the construction of a boiler
 Boilerplate text, any text that is or can be reused in new contexts or applications without being changed much from the original
 Boilerplate code, code that appears in different programs mostly unaltered due to conventions or syntactical requirements to form a minimal program
 Boilerplate contract, standard form contract between two parties that does not allow for negotiation
Boilerplate clause, standard clauses of contractual terms which are included in many contracts

 Boilerplate (robot), fictional combat robot of the Victorian era and early 20th century, created in 2000 by artist Paul Guinan
 Boilerplate (spaceflight), non-functional craft, system, or payload which is used to test various configurations and basic size, load, and handling characteristics